Mathias Krathmann Gehrt (born 7 June 1992) is a Danish professional footballer who plays as a midfielder for Nykøbing FC in the Danish 1st Division.

Club career
Born in Copenhagen, Mathias Gehrt was a Brøndby IF youth graduate, and made his debut with the first team on 6 March 2011, coming on as a 64th-minute substitute for Ousman Jallow in a 1–1 home draw against Lyngby. Gehrt scored his first senior goal against Silkeborg on 3 April, netting the first of a 2–2 home draw.

On 22 August 2013, Gehrt signed a two-year deal with ADO Den Haag.

On 31 August 2016, Gehrt cut ties with ADO. A few weeks later, he signed with Danish 1st Division side FC Helsingør on a deal for the rest of 2016, after a successful tryout. However, his contract was not extended, and he subsequently signed a two-year deal with FC Roskilde.

On 1 September 2018, he signed a deal with Nykøbing FC.

References

External links
 Profile at dbu.dk 
 Voetbal International profile 
 

1992 births
Living people
Danish men's footballers
Danish expatriate men's footballers
Association football midfielders
Danish Superliga players
Eredivisie players
ADO Den Haag players
Brøndby IF players
FC Roskilde players
Nykøbing FC players
Expatriate footballers in the Netherlands
Footballers from Copenhagen